Dewayne Alexander is an American football coach who is currently the head football coach at Tennessee Technological University. He previously served as head football coach at Cumberland University, where he compiled a record of 41–33. Alexander played college football at Tennessee Technological University from 1985 to 1987. Alexander was named head football coach at Tennessee Technological University on December 22, 2017.

Head coaching record

College

References

External links
 Tennessee Tech profile
 East Tennessee State profile
 Cumberland profile

Year of birth missing (living people)
Living people
Cumberland Phoenix football coaches
East Tennessee State Buccaneers football coaches
High school football coaches in Tennessee
Tennessee Tech Golden Eagles football coaches
Tennessee Tech Golden Eagles football players